"Hold On" is a song by the progressive rock band Yes, from their 1983 album, 90125. It reached number 43 on the U.S. Mainstream Rock chart in 1984. Later, the live version from 9012Live: The Solos reached number 27 in 1985.

History 
The core of "Hold On" was written by Yes guitarist Trevor Rabin, prior to his joining the band, as two separate songs: "Hold On" and "Moving In".
Once Rabin joined the band, the two songs were combined, with band members Chris Squire and Jon Anderson contributing additional music and lyrics. All three are credited as writers.

Unlike the other songs on 90125, which are credited as "Produced by Trevor Horn" exclusively, Yes shares a production credit with Horn for "Hold On".

"Hold On" has also appeared on several of Yes' later compilations, including the Yesyears and In a Word: Yes (1969–) box sets.

Alternative versions 
Yes' 1985 follow-up album, 9012Live: The Solos, features a live version of "Hold On".
A live version is also included on 2005's The Word Is Live, and a live performance of "Hold On" is included on the 1991 Greatest Video Hits DVD.

Demos of Rabin's early versions of "Hold On" and "Moving In" were released in 2003 on Rabin's solo album 90124.

References

Yes (band) songs
Song recordings produced by Trevor Horn
Songs written by Trevor Rabin
Songs written by Jon Anderson
Songs written by Chris Squire
1983 songs
Rock ballads